2econd Season is the second and most recent album by Atlanta-based rapper Unk.

Release
It was released on November 4, 2008.

Guest Performers
The album features guest appearances by Sean Kingston, Ray J, Three 6 Mafia and more.

Production
Production as handled mainly by Oomp Camp's own DJ Montay.

Track listing

Chart positions

References 

2008 albums
Unk albums
E1 Music albums